Port Kembla may refer to:

Port Kembla, New South Wales
Port Kembla harbour, the place where cargo is transferred to and from ships
Port Kembla railway station
Port Kembla North railway station
Port Kembla Blacks - Port Kembla Rugby League Football Club
BHP/Austrac Port Kembla 103 locomotive
SS Port Kembla steamship